El alma herida (English title: The wounded soul) is a 2003 Spanish language telenovela produced by the United States-based television network Telemundo Studios, Miami and Mexican Argos Comunicación. The telenovela is a remake of the Puerto Rican 1986 telenovela La cruz de papel.

Itati Cantoral and Gabriel Porras starred as the protagonists, with Rebecca Jones and Alejandro Camacho starred as the adult protagonists, while Rodrigo de la Rosa starred as the main antagonist.

Plot
A family full of hope for a difficult decision to cross the border of the United States in search of the American dream, leaving everything behind without suspecting that fate would play a trick on them. Eugenia Granados, with only eleven years old, his father Salvador Granados and his brother Daniel Salvador on account of the persecution of the police can not cross the border. Her mother Catalina, a beautiful and noble young man is bound by a coyote who was attracted to her, to get to the other side of the border, this coyote tries to abuse her and as he resists this stabs a knife in the belly and left abandoned. A young truck driver, Juan Manuel Mendoza (Gabriel Porras), who appeared from nowhere, shocked by the situation rescues Eugenia, Daniel and Salvador; by a series of tests Salvador comes to believe that his beloved wife died.

The pain and suffering of this family made them move with Juan Manuel, a young shy, generous worker from 14 years of age and that becomes the main protector of the family, employing Salvador. Eugenia will always be grateful to Juan Manuel with whom she falls madly later. Meanwhile, Catalina across the border, despite going through many difficulties, never stop trying to find his family. Her earns his living as ever can, honestly and with dignity until a man marries her only to give his American nationality and a small inheritance that allowed him to go to Patzcuaro, Michoacan, Mexico.

Unfortunately destination the other, she believes that her family lives in the U.S. and decided to return. However, Salvador discovers that his wife is alive, but he believes she left him for another man. When Eugenia discovers that his mother is alive decides to look there, but not before saying goodbye to Juan Manuel with a kiss, which is amazing, saying he has always wanted. He is totally confused by this, because she grew up and never had eyes for anything other than friendship. When in Los Angeles, Eugenia is dedicated to the study and improvement. However, correspondence with Juan Manuel increase his amorous illusions increasingly by his promise that the rise of the novel for so long dreamed. What she did not suspect that this letter is not of Juan Manuel, but his younger brother, Alejandro, who takes everything as a simple game without knowing the illusions it creates.

Years later, Eugenia decides to return, just in time to Mexico and meet with Juan Manuel, but his arrival was totally unexpected and bewildering, making the two brothers fight to win her heart. Eugenia Juan Manuel is disappointed and returned to Los Angeles, he will search, and content themselves by Catalina and Eugenia news reunite. Area no opportunity to speak to Catalina the palms, until more and love can come together, but a series of conflicts with inordinate jealousy of Salvador, and the intrigues of a woman Cristina calculator and ambitious, soon separated. Catalina will have to decide between Frank respectful, noble, attractive man and loves her or Savior, the love of his life, who also loves her but has many problems. Eugenia realizes that his half brother Alexander mafioso be a torment in his life; Juan Manuel will leave by a disease which then pound.
Eugenia and Catalina will have to make very important decisions to become happy and this mission will be very complicated because its terrible past the two have in Soul Wound...

Cast 

Rebecca Jones as Catalina Morales de Granados/vda. de Smith
Itati Cantoral as Eugenia Granados Morales de Mendoza
Gabriel Porras as Juan Manuel Mendoza
Alejandro Camacho as Salvador Granados
Rodrigo de la Rosa as Alejandro Mendoza
Damián Alcazar as Fracisco "Frank" López
Dominika Paleta as Patricia Araiza
Marta Aura as Doña Guadalupe Reyes
Wendy de los Cobos as Cristina
Gloria Peralta as Adriana
Juan Carlos Martín del Campo as Daniel Salvador Granados
Evangelina Martínez as Gudelia 
Guillermo Quintanilla as Cruz Salazar
Elizabeth Cervantes as Berta Villegas 
María Aura as Isabel 
Fabian Peña as Guillermo López Rizo
Fernanda as Clarita
Amor Huerta as Eugenia Granados (child)
Adrian Alonso as Daniel Granados (child)
Evangelina Anderson
Germán Valdés III  as Alejandro Mendoza (young)
Alex Ubago
Arturo Ríos as Marcial Mendoza
Rodolfo Arias as Julián Salazar

References

External links

El alma herida on esmas

American telenovelas
2003 telenovelas
2003 American television series debuts
2004 American television series endings
Spanish-language American telenovelas
Spanish-language telenovelas
American television series based on telenovelas
Telemundo telenovelas